Hugh O'Conor (born 19 April 1975) is an Irish actor, writer, director, and photographer. In 2020, he was listed as number 49 on The Irish Times list of Ireland's greatest film actors.

Career
His first film appearance was opposite Liam Neeson in the 1985 movie Lamb.

He won a Young Artist Awards in 1990 for his role in the Oscar-winning film My Left Foot, in which he portrayed the childhood days of Christy Brown, an Irishman born with cerebral palsy, who could control only his left foot. The film was nominated for five Oscars, including Best Picture, and won two: Daniel Day-Lewis for Best Actor and Brenda Fricker for Best Supporting Actress. In his acceptance speech, Day-Lewis said he “shared Christy's life with a remarkable young actor called Hugh O'Conor.”

He starred in Benjamin Ross' The Young Poisoner's Handbook, which won the Grand Jury Prize at the Sundance Film Festival in 1995.

He was nominated as part of the cast for Outstanding Performance by a Cast at the 2001 SAG-AFTRA awards for his performance as Pére Henri in Chocolat (2000). The film was nominated for five Oscars, including Best Picture. It was also nominated for eight BAFTAs and four Golden Globes, both including Best Picture.

In 2007 he was nominated for Best Actor at the Irish Film and Television Awards for his performance as James Van Der Bexton in Tony Herbert's Speed Dating (2006).

His short film Corduroy was selected for competition as part of the Generation 14Plus presentation at the 60th Berlinale in Berlin. It received the award for Best Fiction/Experimental Film at the 2010 Clones Film Festival.

In 2011, his music videos for I Draw Slow (Swans) and The Whileaways (Dear My Maker) were nominated for the Irish Music Video awards.

He was part of the creative and performing team for RTE's sketch comedy Your Bad Self (2010), along with Domhnall Gleeson and Amy Huberman; the show won Best Entertainment at the 2011 Irish Film and Television Awards.

His photograph Beckah, Dublin Airport was shortlisted and exhibited at the National Gallery of Ireland as part of the inaugural Hennessy Portrait Prize in 2014.

In 2014, he received the Best Supporting Actor award at the Irish Times Theatre Awards for his performance as the Fool in Selina Cartmell's production of King Lear at the Abbey Theatre in Dublin.

In 2018, his feature debut Metal Heart and animated short film The Overcoat premiered at the 2018 Galway Film Fleadh. Jordanne Jones won the Bingham Ray award for Best Newcomer. The Overcoat won Best Animated Sequence.

In 2018, he received the Jim Sheridan Award for Achievement in Irish Film at the Irish Screen America film festival in Los Angeles.

He received the Dublin Film Critics' Circle Maverick award at the 2019 Dublin International Film Festival. The Overcoat received a special mention.

He was nominated for the Independent Spirit award at the 2019 Santa Barbara International Film Festival for Metal Heart.

Personal life
O'Conor was born on 19 April 1975 in Dublin, Ireland.

He studied drama at the Samuel Beckett Centre in Trinity College Dublin, and received a Fulbright scholarship to attend NYU Film School.

Filmography

Film and television as writer and director

References

External links

1975 births
Living people
Irish male film actors
Irish male television actors
People from County Dublin
Irish male child actors
20th-century Irish male actors
21st-century Irish male actors